Dneprovka is a rural locality (a village) in Miyakibashevsky Selsoviet, Miyakinsky District, Bashkortostan, Russia. The population was 80 as of 2010. There are 2 streets.

Geography 
Dneprovka is located 22 km northeast of Kirgiz-Miyaki (the district's administrative centre) by road. Novy Mir is the nearest rural locality.

References 

Rural localities in Miyakinsky District